Television (Italian: Televisione) is a 1931 American comedy film directed by Charles de Rochefort and starring Anna Maria Dossena, Silvio Orsini and Amina Pirani Maggi.

Adapted from the play by Howard Irving Young, it was made at the Joinville Studios in Paris. Paramount Pictures was pursuing a strategy of  producing multiple-language versions there, and this film was made in several different languages. The film's sets were designed by Paolo Reni.

Cast
 Anna Maria Dossena as Jeanne  
 Silvio Orsini as Andrea Leroy, L'inventore  
 Amina Pirani Maggi as La signora Ridon, la portinaia  
 Cesare Zoppetti as Stefani, il finanziere  
 Nino Eller as Sinclair  
 Enrico Signorini as Jean

References

Bibliography
 Waldman, Harry. Missing Reels: Lost Films of American and European Cinema. McFarland, 2000.

External links

1931 films
1931 comedy films
Paramount Pictures films
American comedy films
Films shot at Joinville Studios
1930s Italian-language films
Films directed by Charles de Rochefort
American black-and-white films
1930s American films